Aerolíneas Sosa S.A. de C.V. is an airline based in La Ceiba, Honduras. It was established in 1976 and operates domestic scheduled services to 4 destinations from La Ceiba, as well as charter flights. Its main hub is Golosón International Airport, La Ceiba.

Destinations
Aerolíneas Sosa S.A. de C.V. operates services to the following scheduled domestic destinations:
La Ceiba (LCE) – Golosón International Airport
Roatán (RTB) – Juan Manuel Gálvez International Airport
San Pedro Sula (SAP) – Ramón Villeda Morales International Airport
Tegucigalpa (TGU) – Toncontín International Airport
Útila (UII) – Útila Airport

Fleet

The Aerolíneas Sosa fleet includes the following aircraft (as of September 2020):

The airline previously operated the following aircraft:
1 further Saab 340
3 further Let L-410
1 Britten-Norman Islander
1 Bombardier CRJ100ER

Incidents and accidents
On 7 March 1998, an engine on a Let L-410 UVP aircraft carrying two crew members and 15 passengers failed shortly after takeoff from Golosón International Airport, forcing the crew to turn back to the airport. The wing struck a house, causing the Let to crash into a street. There were no fatalities, but the aircraft was written off.

References

External links
Official website

Airlines of Honduras
La Ceiba
Airlines established in 1984
Honduran brands